Planet Godrej is a  residential skyscraper located on a plot of  at Mahalaxmi, Mumbai, Maharastra, India . Only 5% of the total land was used to build the skyscraper, resulting in a large amount of open space. It was designed by the Singapore-based DP Architects and was also awarded the PINNACLE Award 2006, by Zee Business.

See also
 List of tallest buildings in India

 List of tallest buildings in Mumbai

 List of tallest buildings and structures in the Indian subcontinent

 List of tallest buildings in different cities in India

 List of tallest residential buildings

References

Residential buildings completed in 2006
Godrej Group
Residential skyscrapers in Mumbai